Kihnu Mark is the brand name of an Estonian vodka produced by the Estonian company Remedia. It is 40% alcohol by volume. The vodka takes its name from the Estonian island of Kihnu.

References

External links
KihnuMark.com
AP Online (in Estonian)
Prike

Estonian brands
Estonian vodkas